The Civil Aviation Authority (CAA-CZ) is the civil aviation authority of the Czech Republic. Its head office is on the property of Prague Ruzyně Airport in Ruzyně, Prague.

References

External links

 Civil Aviation Authority
  Civil Aviation Authority

Government of the Czech Republic
Czech Republic
Civil aviation in the Czech Republic
Transport organizations based in the Czech Republic